An autobiography of the same name, Travels with My Cello was published in 1984.

Track listing
 "Flight of the Bumble-bee" by Rimsky-Korsakov Filmed Performance
 "Vilja-Lied" by Lehár
 "Golliwogg's Cake-Walk" by Debussy
 "Traumerei" by Schumann
 "Puerta de Tierra" by Albeniz
 "Le Cygne" by Saint-Saëns Filmed Performance
 "Ave Maria" by J.S. Bach Filmed Performance
 "Andante Affettuoso" by William Lloyd Webber
 "Pizzicato Polka" by Josef Strauss
 "Adagio in G Minor" by Albinoni/Giazotto
 "Irish Tune from County Derry" by Grainger
 "Sabre Dance" by Khatchaturian

Personnel
 Julian Lloyd Webber
 English Chamber Orchestra
 Nicholas Cleobury

Encore! – Travels with My Cello Volume 2

Encore! – Travels with My Cello Volume 2 was released in 1986.

Track listing
 "Bess, You is My Woman Now" by Gershwin
 "Nocturne" by Taube
 "Rondo alla Turca" by Mozart
 "Claire de Lune" by Debussy
 "Skye Boat Song" by Traditional
 "Habanera" by Bizet
 "Un Apres-midi" by Vangelis
 "Song of the Seashore" by Narita
 "When I'm Sixty-Four" by Lennon–McCartney
 "Somewhere" by Bernstein
 "Jesu. Joy of Man's Desiring" by Bach
 "Chant Hindou" by Rimsky-Korsakov
 "You are My Heart's Delight" by Lehár

Personnel
 Julian Lloyd Webber
 Royal Philharmonic Orchestra
 Nicholas Cleobury

References

External links 

 Travels with my Cello reviews
 Encore! Vol.2 reviews

1984 albums
Julian Lloyd Webber albums